"Dog Eat Dog" is a song by Australian hard rock band AC/DC. It is the second track of their album Let There Be Rock, released in 1977, and was written by Angus Young, Malcolm Young, and Bon Scott.

It was released as a single in Australia, and included the non-album track "Carry Me Home" on the B-side, which was later released on Backtracks.

AC/DC played "Dog Eat Dog" on their Black Ice World Tour until early 2010 when they dropped it from the set list and added "High Voltage".

Personnel
Bon Scott – lead vocals
Angus Young – lead guitar
Malcolm Young – rhythm guitar, backing vocals
Mark Evans – bass guitar
Phil Rudd – drums

Production
Producers: Harry Vanda, George Young

Charts

References

External links
Lyrics

AC/DC songs
1977 singles
Songs written by Bon Scott
Songs written by Angus Young
Songs written by Malcolm Young
Song recordings produced by Harry Vanda
Song recordings produced by George Young (rock musician)
1977 songs
Atco Records singles